Leukocyte surface antigen CD53 is a protein that in humans is encoded by the CD53 gene.

The protein encoded by this gene is a member of the transmembrane 4 superfamily, also known as the tetraspanin family. Most of these members are cell-surface proteins that are characterized by the presence of four hydrophobic domains. The proteins mediate signal transduction events that play a role in the regulation of cell development, activation, growth and motility. This encoded protein is a cell surface glycoprotein that is known to complex with integrins. It contributes to the transduction of CD2-generated signals in T cells and natural killer cells and has been suggested to play a role in growth regulation. Familial deficiency of this gene has been linked to an immunodeficiency associated with recurrent infectious diseases caused by bacteria, fungi and viruses. Alternative splicing results in multiple transcript variants encoding the same protein.

See also
 Cluster of differentiation
 Tetraspanin

References

Further reading

External links
 
 

Clusters of differentiation